Cilia And Flagella Associated Protein 206 (CFAP206) is a gene that in humans encodes a protein “DUF3508”. This protein has a function that is not currently very well understood. Other known aliases are “dJ382I10.1, UPF0704 Protein C6orf165.” In humans, the gene coding sequence is 56,501 base pairs long, with an mRNA of 2,215 base pairs, and a protein sequence of 622 amino acids. The C6orf165 gene is conserved in chimpanzee, rhesus monkey, dog, cow, mouse, rat, chicken, zebrafish, mosquito, frog, and more
C6orf165 is rarely expressed in humans, with relatively high expression in brain, lungs (trachea) and testis. The molecular weight of UPF0704 is 71,193 Da  and the PI is 6.38

Gene Locus 
The CFAP206 gene is located at Chromosome 6 from 88119558-88173965(6q15). It contains 12 exons.
The genomic DNA is 54,407 base pairs long, while the longest mRNA that it produces is 2,215 bp long.

Homology and Evolution

Orthologs 
This protein is well conserved through a series of distantly related organisms including mammals, birds, amphibians, tunicates, bony fish, lancelets, insects, and sea urchins. The list of organisms in which orthologs have been found is shown below.

Paralogs 
C6orf165 has no paralog.

Phylogeny 
The rooted phylogeny tree is shown below

Protein 
The protein that is produced by the C6orf165 gene is termed DUF3508 and is 622 amino acids long. The protein has a predicated molecular weight of 71.20 kDa and isoelectric point of 6.38.

Domains 
The C6orf165 gene protein product contains a well conserved domain  DUF3508  This presumed domain is functionally uncharacterized. This domain is found in eukaryotes. This domain is about 280 amino acids in length.

Motifs 
This domain has two conserved sequence motifs: GFC and GLL.

Post-translational modifications 
The only predicted post-translational modification this protein undergo is phosphorylation after trying all tools under post translational modification category on expasy.org. Three phosphorylation site is predicted with score over 0.8.
Phosphorylation on Ser 176,Thr 232 and Ser 310 are notified on the conceptual translation.

Secondary structure 
The consensus of the prediction software PELE predicts that protein UPF0704 is dominated by alpha helices with interspersed regions of random coil.
 PSORT II analysis predicts that there is a coiled_coil_region from 88 to 117 with sequence MNYTNRVEFLEEHHRVLESRLGSVTREITD.

Location 
PSORT II analysis trained on yeast data predicts that the subcellular location of this protein is most likely in the cytoplasm (56%). Less likely possibilities are in the mitochondria (21%) or in the nucleus (17%) or in vacuoles (4%).

Gene expression

Gene expression data 
From the EST file of Unigene, the gene expression in human is not strong, the gene EST/EST in pool is really low, even low than 0.01%. These little expression is in brain, connective tissue, kidney, lungs, parathyroid, pharynx, placenta, testis and trachea.  In mouse, the gene expression of C6orf165 is even lower, the gene is only expressed in two body parts, ovary and testis. In chicken, the weak expressions are in two body part, brain and testis. In zebra fish, gene expression is still low, the very weak expressions are in eye, kidney and reproductive system. In sea squirt, the expressions are in gonad, heart and neural complex.
In summary, c6orf165 is expressed conservatively in testis across the species and partially conservatively in brain or neural complex.

Promoter 
The promoter region for human c6orf165 is identified by ElDorado (at Genomatix).

In addition to this, the start codon is at the second exon of the mRNA and this indicate the first exon is spliced during the modification.

Transcript variants 
In humans, the c6orf165 gene produces 4 different transcripts, 2 of which form a protein product (one undergoes nonsense mediated decay ang the other is  retained intron). The main transcript in humans is transcript ID  ENST00000369562, or C6ORF165-001; it has 13 exons and 12 coding exons; the translation length is 622 residues

The second protein coding transcript in human is transcript ID ENST00000480123 or C6ORF165-002;it contains 7 exons and only 6 exons are protein coding; the translation length is 252 residues

Interactions 
Two-hybrid experiments revealed interacting proteins such as Myogenic repressor I-mf. This repressor is highly expressed in sclerotome. It inhibits the transactivation activity of the MyoD family and represses myogenesis.
Protein complex co-immunoprecipitation (Co-IP) experiments revealed interacting protein NRF1 nuclear respiratory factor 1 This gene encodes a protein that homodimerizes and functions as a transcription factor which activates the expression of some key metabolic genes regulating cellular growth and nuclear genes required for respiration, heme biosynthesis, and mitochondrial DNA transcription and replication.
Two-hybrid experiments revealed interacting protein RNF138 (ring finger protein 138), an E3 ubiquitin protein ligase.
Affinity Capture-Western reveal an interaction protein called TP73 tumor protein p73, which is a protein related to the p53 tumor protein.

Clinical significance 
C6orf165 has no currently known disease associations or mutations.

References 

Uncharacterized proteins